Lalith may refer to

 Lalith Dissanayake, Sri Lankan politician
 Lalith Athulathmudali, Sri Lankan politician
 Babu M.R. Lalith, Indian chess player
 Lalith Wijerathna, Sri Lankan politician
 Lalith Kaluperuma, Sri Lankan cricketer
 Lalith Kotelawala, Sri Lankan businessman
 Lalith J. Rao, Indian classical singer
 Lalith Weeratunga, Sri Lankan politician
 Lalith Gamage, Sri Lankan professor
 Lalith Jayasinghe, Sri Lankan Army officer
 Lalith Jayasundara, Sri Lankan cricketer umpire

Sinhalese masculine given names